Asthenotricha meruana is a moth in the family Geometridae first described by Per Olof Christopher Aurivillius in 1910. It is found in Tanzania.

References

External links
Images of the types in the Swedish Museum of Natural History

Moths described in 1910
Asthenotricha
Moths of Africa